Mary Cunningham may refer to:
 Mary Elizabeth Cunningham, Irish philanthropist and war worker
 Mary Cunningham, American competitor in Diving at the 1951 Pan American Games 
 Mary Cunningham Agee, American business executive and author
 Mary Cunningham Boyce, American engineering professor